Daniel Marshall Wheeler (born May 17, 1987) is an American professional wrestler. He is currently signed to All Elite Wrestling (AEW) under the ring name Cash Wheeler. Wheeler is also known for his time in WWE, under the ring name Dash Wilder. In WWE, he held both the Raw and SmackDown Tag Team Championships as well as the NXT Tag Team Championship and WWE 24/7 Championship along with his partner Scott Dawson.

Professional wrestling career

Independent circuit (2005–2014) 
Wheeler made his professional wrestling debut in 2005, wrestled extensively on the independent circuit under the ring name Steven Walters. He most notably appeared for NWA Anarchy, where he won both the NWA Anarchy Television Championship and the NWA Anarchy Tag Team Championship, and for numerous other promotions such as OMEGA Championship Wrestling, Resistance Pro Wrestling and Dragon Gate USA. He also wrestled internationally for promotions such as All Star Wrestling, Preston City Wrestling, and Pro Wrestling ZERO1.

WWE (2014–2020) 

Wheeler signed with WWE in 2014 and reported to the WWE Performance Center, taking the ring name Dash Wilder. Dusty Rhodes gave Wheeler the ring name, Dash Wilder; Wheeler wanted to call his character "Cash" instead of "Dash", but Rhodes preferred the latter because it reminded him of his son Cody's nickname, "Dashing", while Wilder was chosen due to its similarity to Wheeler. He immediately formed a tag-team with Scott Dawson, with the two performing extensively at live events under the name The Mechanics. The duo made their debut on the July 17, 2014 episode of NXT, losing to Bull Dempsey and Mojo Rawley. The duo made only one further televised appearance in 2014, losing to Enzo Amore and Colin Cassady on the October 23 episode of NXT, but continued to wrestle extensively at house shows.

Dawson and Wilder's team resurfaced and picked up their first televised win on the July 29, 2015 episode of NXT, defeating Amore and Cassady. The duo were involved in an 8-man tag-team match that was taped prior to NXT TakeOver: Brooklyn. At NXT TakeOver: Respect, Dawson and Wilder were defeated in the semi-finals of the Dusty Rhodes Tag Team Classic by eventual winners Samoa Joe and Finn Bálor. On the October 21 episode of NXT, The Mechanics' ring name was changed to Dash and Dawson. The duo would go on win the NXT Tag Team Championship from The Vaudevillains on the November 11 episode of NXT. They subsequently defended the titles against Enzo Amore and Colin Cassady at NXT TakeOver: London. Beginning in February 2016, the duo began performing under the team name The Revival. The two made their main roster debuts on March 12, 2016 at Roadblock, again successfully defending their championships against Amore and Cassady.

On April 1 at NXT TakeOver: Dallas, The Revival lost the NXT Tag Team Championship to American Alpha (Chad Gable and Jason Jordan) but the two won back the titles from American Alpha two months later at NXT TakeOver: The End. At NXT TakeOver: Brooklyn II, The Revival retained the titles against Johnny Gargano and Tommaso Ciampa. In a rematch at NXT Takeover: Toronto, Tommaso Ciampa and Johnny Gargano won the NXT Tag Team Championship in a 2 out of 3 falls match. At NXT TakeOver: Orlando, Wilder and Dawson lost to The Authors of Pain in a triple threat match for the NXT Tag Team Championship, also involving DIY.

On the April 3 episode of Raw, The Revival answered an open challenge issued by The New Day. The Revival would defeat The New Day, and afterwards attacked Kofi Kingston, who was not participating in the match. On April 14, Dash Wilder fractured his jaw during an NXT match in Spartanburg, South Carolina against Hideo Itami and Shinsuke Nakamura which required surgery and would keep him out of action for eight weeks. Wilder returned to in ring competition on the June 26 taping of Main Event aired on June 30, teaming with Dawson to defeat Karl Anderson and Luke Gallows by pinfall. On the June 25, 2018 episode of Raw, Wilder pinned Roman Reigns in a tag team match. On SummerSlam pre-show, The Revival lost to The B-Team (Bo Dallas and Curtis Axel) in an attempt to become the Raw Tag Team Champions. At Survivor Series, they were part of Team Raw, but lost to Team SmackDown in the 10-on-10 Survivor Series tag team elimination match.

Following this they began a feud against Lucha House Party (Kalisto, Gran Metalik and Lince Dorado) and suffered various losses in handicap matches. On Raw, December 17, 2018 they defeated Lucha House Party, The B-Team and AOP in a Fatal 4-Way Match receiving a title shot for the Raw Tag Team Titles. During the next two Raw episodes they challenged Bobby Roode and Chad Gable for the titles but Dawson and Wilder were unsuccessful to win the matches in controversial fashion. Dave Meltzer of The Wrestling Observer reported that the duo asked for their release from their WWE contracts following their match against Lucha House Party on the January 14, 2019 episode of Raw. On February 11, 2019 episode of Raw, Dawson and Wilder defeated the team of Roode and Gable to win the Raw Tag Team Championships. At WrestleMania 35, The Revival lost the titles to the team of Curt Hawkins and Zack Ryder.

On the August 12, 2019 during a scheduled tag team match at Raw (the episode post-SummerSlam) in which The Revival were facing Lucha House Party (Lince Dorado and Gran Metalik, with Kalisto), R-Truth ran out from backstage, being chased by several wrestlers. The match was called off and The Revival performed a "Hart Attack" on Truth and simultaneously pinned him to become the first co-champions of the 24/7 Championship. However in the same night R-Truth pinned Dawson, with the help of Carmella, and regained the title.
 The Revival began to align themselves with Randy Orton in a feud against The New Day. On September 15 at Clash of Champions, The Revival defeated Xavier Woods and Big E for the SmackDown Tag Team Championship, making them the first team to hold the Raw Tag Team Championship, SmackDown Tag Team Championship, and NXT Tag Team Championship. The Revival was drafted to SmackDown as part of the 2019 WWE Draft. On April 10, 2020, both Wilder and his tag team partner Dawson were released from their WWE contracts.

All Elite Wrestling (2020–present) 
After leaving WWE, Wilder (now known as Cash Wheeler) and Dawson (now known as Dax Harwood) adopted the new name of FTR and started appearing at All Elite Wrestling (AEW) shows. They debuted on the May 27, 2020 episode of AEW Dynamite, entering the Daily's Place amphitheater in a pickup truck and attacking The Butcher and The Blade. In July 2020, after appearing on AEW television for two months despite not being under contract with the company, Wheeler and Harwood signed multi-year contracts with AEW.  In November 2020, Harwood and Wheeler revealed in an interview with Talk Sport journalist Alex McCarthy that FTR wanted to join AEW, despite being offered a huge amount of money to stay in the WWE, because they kept getting pulled from main roster events in the WWE, with Wheeler stating that "Once we got pulled from all of our dates on the main roster, it was down to NXT as the option and we talked to Hunter at length, there were offers on the table that were very tempting because we loved NXT and we loved our time there, but at the end of the day like Dax said, we knew that our time there was done."

Other media 
Wilder made his video game debut as a playable character in WWE 2K17, and has since appeared in WWE 2K18, WWE 2K19, and WWE 2K20.

Personal life 
Wheeler stated in a May 2020 interview that all of his matches up to this point in time, his favorites were live event matches between The Revival and American Alpha during their NXT days. He stated that his favorite on-screen match was the match between the two teams at NXT TakeOver: Dallas, as, while he believed that the match between The Revival and DIY at NXT TakeOver: Toronto in 2016 was better, NXT TakeOver: Dallas had "a special magical atmosphere". In a November 2020 interview, Wheeler described FTR's upcoming match with The Young Bucks at Full Gear  as a "dream match," stating "Dream match label or not, I think Dax and I always put a lot of pressure on ourselves, to go out there and perform at the highest level and to be the best. So, the match with The Young Bucks notwithstanding, we always have a lot of pressure on our shoulders."

Championships and accomplishments 

 All Elite Wrestling
 AEW World Tag Team Championship (1 time) – with Dax Harwood
 Anarchy Wrestling
 NWA Anarchy Tag Team Championship (2 times) – with Derrick Driver
 NWA Anarchy Television Championship (1 time)
 The Baltimore Sun
 WWE Tag Team of the Year (2016) – with Scott Dawson
 Lucha Libre AAA Worldwide
 AAA World Tag Team Championship (1 time) – with Dax Harwood
 New Japan Pro Wrestling
 IWGP Tag Team Championship (1 time) - with Dax Harwood
 Pro Wrestling Illustrated
 Tag Team of the Year (2022) 
 Ranked No. 98 of the top 500 singles wrestlers in the PWI 500 in 2019
 Ranked No. 1 of the top 50 tag teams in the PWI Tag Team 50 in 2020 
 Ring of Honor
 ROH World Tag Team Championship (1 time) - with Dax Harwood
 Sports Illustrated
 Ranked No. 9 of the top 10 wrestlers in 2022
 WrestleForce
 WrestleForce Tag Team Championship (1 time) – with John Skyler
 WWE
 WWE 24/7 Championship (1 time) – with Scott Dawson
 WWE Raw Tag Team Championship (2 times) – with Scott Dawson
 WWE SmackDown Tag Team Championship (1 time) – with Scott Dawson
 NXT Tag Team Championship (2 times) – with Scott Dawson
 First WWE Tag Team Triple Crown Champions – with Scott Dawson
 NXT Year-End Award (2 times)
 Match of the Year (2016) – with Scott Dawson vs. #DIY (Johnny Gargano and Tommaso Ciampa) in a two-out-of-three falls match for the NXT Tag Team Championship at NXT TakeOver: Toronto
 Tag Team of the Year (2016) – with Scott Dawson
Wilder and Scott Dawson simultaneously pinned R-Truth to become co-WWE 24/7 Champions.
 Wrestling Observer Newsletter
 Feud of the Year (2022) 
 Tag Team of the Year (2022)

References

External links 

 
 
 
 
 

1987 births
All Elite Wrestling personnel
American male professional wrestlers
Living people
People from Dare County, North Carolina
Professional wrestlers from North Carolina
Sportspeople from Raleigh, North Carolina
WWE 24/7 Champions
NXT Tag Team Champions
AEW World Tag Team Champions
21st-century professional wrestlers
ROH World Tag Team Champions
IWGP Heavyweight Tag Team Champions
AAA World Tag Team Champions